is the first "best of" compilation from the J-pop idol group Morning Musume, and was released January 31, 2001. It is currently the largest selling album of their career and sold a total of 2,259,510 copies. It contained their first eleven singles in non-chronological order (with their biggest single to date, "Love Machine", starting off the track sequence) and some other album and single favorites; it also included a new song, "Say Yeah!: Motto Miracle Night." The first press came in special packaging with a mini board game.

Track listing 
 
 
 
 
 
 "I Wish"
 
 
 
 
 
 
 
 "Never Forget"

Sales and certifications

References

External links 
  Best! Morning Musume 1 entry at Up-Front Works

Morning Musume compilation albums
2001 greatest hits albums
Zetima compilation albums